Catch of the Day can refer to:

 "Catch of the Day" (Dexter's Laboratory), an episode of Dexter's Laboratory
 Catch of the Day, a work by cartoonist Jim Toomey